Richard Jebb may refer to:
Sir Richard Jebb, 1st Baronet (1729–1787), English physician
Richard Jebb (barrister) (1766–1834), Irish judge
Richard Jebb (journalist) (1874–1953), English journalist and author
Richard Claverhouse Jebb (1841–1905), British classical scholar and politician